The 2008–09 Auburn Tigers women's basketball team represented Auburn University in the 2008–09 NCAA Division I basketball season. The Tigers were coached by Nell Fortner. The Tigers were a member of the Southeast Conference and won the regular season SEC title.

Exhibition

Regular season
November 14: DeWanna Bonner tallied 25 points, eight rebounds and six steals as the Tigers defeated Alabama A&M 91-53 in its season opener in Huntsville, Alabama. The Tigers shot 50 percent from the field and forced 37 Bulldog turnovers in the win. Five Auburn players finished in double-digit scoring while also posting a 50-31 rebounding advantage.
November 19: Auburn senior Sherell Hobbs scored the 1,000th point of her career as the Tigers cruised to a 71-45 win against Georgia Southern in Statesboro, Ga. Auburn improved to 3-0 on the season and the start is the third in a row for the Auburn women's basketball team under Nell Fortner.
November 30: Alli Smalley scored 21 points as Auburn picked up a 63-52 win against Florida International to win the FIU Thanksgiving Classic tournament title. Averaging 15 points in the two tournament games, Smalley was named its MVP.
 December 30: The Tigers (14-0) downed Miami (9-4), 68-53, to win the Miami Holiday Tournament. The tournament win is the second of the season as Auburn also won the Florida International Thanksgiving Classic. Auburn trailed at the half for just the second time this season, going into the locker room at halftime down 32-30. The Tigers managed to put together a 38-21 second half en route to the 15-point win. Senior Whitney Boddie was named tournament MVP.
 January 25: DeWanna Bonner posted a career-high 35 points and nine rebounds as Auburn defeated defending national champion Tennessee 82-68. The crowd of 12,067 shattered the previous attendance record of 7,150 that dated back to Jan. 6, 1989. The Auburn win was the first over Tennessee since March 2, 1997, when the Tigers defeated the Lady Vols, 61-59, in the SEC Tournament semifinals. The victory is also the largest ever for Auburn over Tennessee with the previous high an eight-point win (67-59) on Jan. 7, 1989 in Auburn.

Roster

Schedule

Player stats

Postseason

SEC Tournament

March 8: Christina Wirth scored 20 points, as Vanderbilt beat Auburn 61-54 to win the Southeastern Conference tournament. The 24-8 Commodores upset the 29-3 Tigers for the second time in three weeks. Vanderbilt also extended its winning streak over Auburn to 15.

NCAA basketball tournament
Auburn 85, Lehigh 49
Rutgers 80, Auburn 52

Awards and honors
DeWanna Bonner, 2008 Alabama Amateur Athlete of the Year 
DeWanna Bonner, State Farm/WBCA First-Team All-American (she is the fifth Auburn player ever to earn the honor)
Whitney Boddie, Most Valuable Player, Auburn Women's Basketball Team
Whitney Boddie, Miami Holiday Tournament Most Valuable Player
Alli Smalley, FIU Thanksgiving Classic tournament Most Valuable Player

Team players drafted into the WNBA

References

External links
Official Site

Auburn Tigers women's basketball seasons
Auburn
Auburn